The 1979–80 Yugoslav Second League season was the 34th season of the Second Federal League, the second level association football competition of SFR Yugoslavia, since its establishment in 1946. The league was contested in two regional groups (West Division and East Division), with 16 clubs each.

West Division

Teams
A total of sixteen teams contested the league, including eleven sides from the 1978–79 season, one club relegated from the 1978–79 Yugoslav First League and four sides promoted from the Inter-Republic Leagues played in the 1978–79 season. The league was contested in a double round robin format, with each club playing every other club twice, for a total of 30 rounds. Two points were awarded for wins and one point for draws.

NK Zagreb were relegated from the 1978–79 Yugoslav First League after finishing the season in 17th place of the league table. The four clubs promoted to the second level were Istra Pula, Jedinstvo Bihać, Rudar Trbovlje and Vrbas.

League table

East Division

Teams
A total of sixteen teams contested the league, including eleven sides from the 1978–79 season, one club relegated from the 1977–78 Yugoslav First League and four sides promoted from the Inter-Republic Leagues played in the 1978–79 season. The league was contested in a double round robin format, with each club playing every other club twice, for a total of 30 rounds. Two points were awarded for wins and one point for draws.

OFK Belgrade were relegated from the 1978–79 Yugoslav First League after finishing the season in 18th place of the league table. The four clubs promoted to the second level were Bor, Pobeda, Prishtina and OFK Titograd.

Due to suspicion of match fixing in the last round of the league, Football Association of Yugoslavia penalized the top three clubs and Galenika Zemun earned a promotion spot to the Yugoslav First League. However, after an appeal in summer 1980 that decision was retracted and OFK Belgrade was promoted.

League table

See also
1979–80 Yugoslav First League
1979–80 Yugoslav Cup

References
General

Yugoslav Second League seasons
Yugo
2